Sara (also Romanized as Sārā) is a 1993 motion picture directed by Dariush Mehrjui. The film is based on Henrik Ibsen's 1879 play A Doll's House, with Sara in the role of Nora, Hessam in the role of Torvald, Sima in the role of Ms Linde and Goshtasb in the role of Nils Krogstad.

The movie won the Audience Award at the Nantes Three Continents Festival, and tied for the Golden Seashell at the San Sebastián International Film Festival, where Niki Karimi won Best Actress award (Silver Seashell) for the title role and Yassamin Maleknasr Best Supporting Actress in Fajer Film Festival.

See also
 Cinema of Iran
 Dariush Mehrjui
 Niki Karimi

References

External links 
 

1993 films
Iranian drama films
1990s Persian-language films
Films based on A Doll's House
Films directed by Dariush Mehrjui
1992 drama films
1992 films
1993 drama films
Films whose writer won the Best Screenplay Crystal Simorgh